Fabio Renán Ulloa Castillo (born 20 August 1976 Tela, Honduras) is a Honduran footballer.

Club career
Ulloa has played professionally for Olimpia, and has won seven national championships.

Águila
He has won a Salvadoran Clausura championship with C.D. Águila in 2006, after joining them in summer 2005. After a year he looked to leave them for Marathón but ended up with F.C. Motagua. He however returned to Aguila within a month.

He joined Real Juventud before the 2009 Clausura.

C.D. Necaxa
On 8 August 2010, Ulloa made his debut in the Liga Nacional de Futbol de Honduras with C.D. Necaxa against F.C. Motagua in a 3-0 win, and scored his first goal on 24 October 2010 against Deportes Savio in a 1-2 defeat. He left them for Savio in 2012.

International career
Ulloa played for Honduras at the 1995 FIFA World Youth Championship in the United Arab Emirates, where he was sent off against Portugal.

He made his senior debut for Honduras in a May 1994 Miami Cup against El Salvador and has earned a total of 10 caps, scoring no goals. He has represented his country at the 1997 UNCAF Nations Cup.

His final international was an August 2006 friendly match against Venezuela.

Personal life 
Ulloa married his school sweetheart, Ivis Estela Parham with whom he has a son named Favio Ulloa Jr. Years later he remarried, Honduran TV host, Helena Alvarez with whom he has a son named Sebastian Ulloa Alvarez. He remarried for the third time and has a younger daughter. He currently lives in Santa Ana, California.

In 2001, he was jailed after being accused of raping a young woman in his apartment. He was only released after 6 days after charges against him were dropped.

References

External links

"Puedo lavar, planchar y cocinar" (Interview) - Diez 

1976 births
Living people
Honduran footballers
Honduras international footballers
Association football central defenders
C.D. Olimpia players
C.D. Victoria players
C.D. Águila footballers
F.C. Motagua players
C.D. Real Juventud players
Liga Nacional de Fútbol Profesional de Honduras players
Honduran expatriate footballers
Expatriate footballers in El Salvador
Honduran expatriate sportspeople in El Salvador
People from Tela